Gorenje Brdo is a settlement in the hills north of the Poljane Sora Valley in the Municipality of Gorenja Vas–Poljane in the Upper Carniola region of Slovenia.

References

External links 

Gorenje Brdo on Geopedia

Populated places in the Municipality of Gorenja vas-Poljane